Roberto Crivello (born 14 September 1991) is an Italian footballer who plays as a left back for Padova, on loan from Palermo.

Career
Crivello started his career as a youth player with Mondello club Parmonval, before being scouted and signed by Juventus in 2009.

In 2013 he joined Lega Pro Prima Divisione club Frosinone, with whom he won two consecutive promotions and made his Serie A debut in 2015. He was also part of Frosinone's 2018 squad that won their second Serie A promotion in the club's history.

In 2018 he joined Serie B club Spezia. In August 2019 he rescinded his contract with Spezia and joined hometown club Palermo (Serie D level) as a free transfer. He was part of Palermo's squad that won promotion to Serie C and then to Serie B in 2022.

On 6 January 2023, after appearing sparingly for the Rosanero in the first half of the club's 2022–23 Serie B campaign, Crivello was loaned out to Serie C club Padova until the end of the season.

Career statistics

Club

References

1991 births
Footballers from Palermo
Living people
Association football defenders
Italian footballers
Serie A players
Serie B players
Serie C players
Serie D players
Juventus F.C. players
Carrarese Calcio players
S.S.D. Città di Gela players
A.S.D. Victor San Marino players
Frosinone Calcio players
Spezia Calcio players
Palermo F.C. players
Calcio Padova players